Ocean Township is a township in Ocean County, New Jersey. As of the 2010 United States Census, the township's population was 8,332, reflecting an increase of 1,882 (+29.2%) from the 6,450 counted in the 2000 Census, which had in turn increased by 1,034 (+19.1%) from the 5,416 counted in the 1990 Census. The 2010 population was the highest recorded in any decennial census.

History
Ocean Township was incorporated as a township by an act of the New Jersey Legislature on April 13, 1876, from portions of both Lacey Township and Union Township (now Barnegat Township). Portions of the township were taken to create Long Beach Township (March 23, 1899) and Island Beach (June 23, 1933; dissolved in 1965 and absorbed into Berkeley Township). The township derives its name from its seaside location.

All of Ocean Township is commonly referred to as "Waretown" by local residents. The local custom is so widespread that it surprises some new residents that the official name is Ocean Township. Non-residents have been known to confuse Ocean Township with the Ocean Township of Monmouth County. There was a petition drive in 2006 to get a name change to Township of Waretown on the ballot but it failed to obtain enough signatures.

The name Waretown is derived from Abraham Weair (1683–1768), who came to the area with a colony of Rogerine Baptists (Quaker Baptists) . When the colony left the area eleven years later, Weair, who had built a sawmill, stayed behind and became a prominent member of the community.

During the American Revolutionary War, British ships sailed into the nearby Barnegat Inlet in an attempt to protect their New York-bound supply vessels from attacks by local privateers sailing schooners and whaleboats. Another British objective was to destroy Newlin's salt works, a local supplier of a crucial commodity to the Revolutionary army, needed for food preservation and gunpowder manufacture. A massacre of local patriots occurred in October, 1782, when Captain John Bacon, loyal to the British crown, led a surprise attack on Long Beach.

During the War of 1812, the British returned to Barnegat Inlet to blockade the Jersey coast. Local privateers were caught and their schooners burned.

In the 1700s and 1800s, Waretown was a shipbuilding center. Vessels such as barques, barkentines, sloops, schooners, whaleboats and sneakboxes were constructed of white cedar native to the area. During this period, many sea captains built stately homes on bay front lots.

Around the turn of the twentieth century, Waretown fishermen sold oysters, clams and scallops to dealers such as the Fulton Fish Market in New York City. Other local industries included charcoal production, cranberry farming and "mossing," or gathering sphagnum moss for sale to florists. Local hunters supplied New York and Philadelphia with wildfowl via the railroads. Waretown became known for its hunting and fishing grounds, and celebrities like Presidents Grover Cleveland and William McKinley, baseball great Babe Ruth, and Wild West entertainer Buffalo Bill Cody came to participate in these pursuits.

During World War II, blimps cruised along the Jersey coast looking for German U-boats. Local fishermen reported periscopes of U-boats within 20 miles of the shore. As a precaution, troops were stationed in town at the Bayview Hotel on Barnegat Bay. In 1960, the landmark structure burned to the ground, nearly 70 years after its opening in 1890.

Geography
According to the United States Census Bureau, the township had a total area of 32.81 square miles (84.97 km2), including 21.10 square miles (54.65 km2) of land and 11.70 square miles (30.31 km2) of water (35.67%).

Waretown (with a 2010 Census population of 1,569) is an unincorporated community and census-designated place (CDP) located within Ocean Township.

Other unincorporated communities, localities and place names located partially or completely within the township include Brookville, Wells Mills, Pebble Beach, Barnegat Beach, Holiday Beach, Sands Point Harbor, Skippers Cove, Bay Haven and Dogtown.

The township borders the Ocean County municipalities of Barnegat Light, Barnegat Township, Berkeley Township, Lacey Township and Long Beach Township.

The township is one of 56 South Jersey municipalities that are included within the New Jersey Pinelands National Reserve, a protected natural area of unique ecology covering , that has been classified as a United States Biosphere Reserve and established by Congress in 1978 as the nation's first National Reserve. All of the township is included in either the state-designated Pinelands Area or the Pinelands National Reserve, which includes portions of Burlington County, along with areas in Atlantic, Camden, Cape May, Cumberland, Gloucester and Ocean counties.

Demographics

Census 2010

The Census Bureau's 2006–2010 American Community Survey showed that (in 2010 inflation-adjusted dollars) median household income was $74,736 (with a margin of error of +/− $6,360) and the median family income was $75,815 (+/− $7,572). Males had a median income of $49,189 (+/− $9,450) versus $33,250 (+/− $10,524) for females. The per capita income for the borough was $36,895 (+/− $4,315). About 0.9% of families and 4.0% of the population were below the poverty line, including 4.2% of those under age 18 and 2.2% of those age 65 or over.

Census 2000
As of the 2000 United States Census there were 6,450 people, 2,446 households, and 1,743 families residing in the township. The racial makeup of the township was 97.33% White, 0.74% African American, 0.16% Native American, 0.42% Asian, 0.03% Pacific Islander, 0.36% from other races, and 0.96% from two or more races. Hispanic or Latino of any race were 3.10% of the population.

There were 2,446 households, out of which 33.4% had children under the age of 18 living with them, 57.5% were married couples living together, 9.6% had a female householder with no husband present, and 28.7% were non-families. 23.3% of all households were made up of individuals, and 10.1% had someone living alone who was 65 years of age or older. The average household size was 2.61 and the average family size was 3.08.

In the township the population was spread out, with 25.5% under the age of 18, 6.8% from 18 to 24, 30.3% from 25 to 44, 23.7% from 45 to 64, and 13.8% who were 65 years of age or older. The median age was 38 years. For every 100 females, there were 98.5 males. For every 100 females age 18 and over, there were 97.3 males.

The median income for a household in the township was $46,461, and the median income for a family was $55,379. Males had a median income of $39,149 versus $32,188 for females. The per capita income for the township was $22,830. About 5.6% of families and 7.8% of the population were below the poverty line, including 10.1% of those under age 18 and 4.6% of those age 65 or over.

Parks and recreation 
Park facilities in Ocean Township include:

 Waretown Lake and Recreation Area, 182 Wells Mill Road, includes a swimming lake, tennis courts, children's playset, picnic tables and a covered pavilion.
 Tuomey Park, 230 11th Street, includes a baseball field, basketball courts, horseshoe pits, children's playset and picnic tables.
 Crystal Bay Peninsula Park, end of Tuscarora Avenue, includes benches and picnic tables.
 Waretown Municipal Dock, end of Bryant Road, includes a fishing pier.
 Sands Point Park/Boat Ramp, 49 Dock Avenue, includes a fishing pier, fish cleaning facility, boat launch, trailer parking, tennis courts, children's playset and picnic tables.
 Wells Mills County Park, 905 Wells Mill Road, is the largest county park, comprising over 900 acres of Pinelands forest managed by the Ocean County Department of Parks and Recreation. Included are 16 miles of marked trails for hiking and biking, a freshwater lake for fishing and boating, rental canoes in season, a picnic area, playground, and the Wells Mills Nature Center with the Elizabeth Meirs Morgan Observation Deck. In the late 1800s the Estlow family built two adjacent sawmills on the property, giving the name of the park its plural nature. The first person to dam the Oyster Creek and build a sawmill in this locale was James Wells in the late 1700s. 
 Barnegat Branch Trail is an Ocean County rail trail that runs through Ocean Township along an abandoned rail corridor of the Barnegat Branch Division of the Central Railroad of New Jersey. When completed, the trail will extend  from Barnegat to Toms River. Seven continuous miles of the trail are open from Barnegat to Lacey Township, plus several shorter segments.

Government

Local government 
Ocean Township is governed under the Township form of New Jersey municipal government, one of 141 municipalities (of the 564) statewide that use this form, the second-most commonly used form of government in the state. The Township Committee is comprised of three members, who are elected directly by the voters at-large in partisan elections to serve three-year terms of office on a staggered basis, with one seat coming up for election each year as part of the November general election in a three-year cycle. At an annual reorganization meeting, the Township Committee selects one of its members to serve as Mayor.

, Township Committee members are Mayor Ben LoParo (R, term on committee and as mayor ends December 31, 2022), Deputy Mayor Kenneth Baulderstone (R, term on committee ends 2023; term as deputy mayor ends 2022) and Lydia Dodd (R, 2024).

On July 23, 2009, local Republican party member and former Mayor Daniel Van Pelt was arrested by the Federal Bureau of Investigation as part of a statewide money laundering investigation. In May 2010, Van Pelt was convicted on federal corruption charges, and had been scheduled to be sentenced to federal prison on November 4, 2010.

Federal, state, and county representation 
Ocean Township is located in the 2nd Congressional District and is part of New Jersey's 9th state legislative district.

 

Ocean County is governed by a Board of County Commissioners comprised of five members who are elected on an at-large basis in partisan elections and serving staggered three-year terms of office, with either one or two seats coming up for election each year as part of the November general election. At an annual reorganization held in the beginning of January, the board chooses a Director and a Deputy Director from among its members. , Ocean County's Commissioners (with party affiliation, term-end year and residence) are:

Commissioner Director John P. Kelly (R, 2022, Eagleswood Township),
Commissioner Deputy Director Virginia E. Haines (R, 2022, Toms River),
Barbara Jo Crea (R, 2024, Little Egg Harbor Township)
Gary Quinn (R, 2024, Lacey Township) and
Joseph H. Vicari (R, 2023, Toms River). Constitutional officers elected on a countywide basis are 
County Clerk Scott M. Colabella (R, 2025, Barnegat Light),
Sheriff Michael G. Mastronardy (R, 2022; Toms River) and
Surrogate Jeffrey Moran (R, 2023, Beachwood).

Politics
As of March 23, 2011, there were a total of 6,245 registered voters in Ocean Township, of which 1,017 (16.3%) were registered as Democrats, 2,095 (33.5%) were registered as Republicans and 3,128 (50.1%) were registered as Unaffiliated. There were 5 voters registered as Libertarians or Greens. Among the township's 2010 Census population, 75.0% (vs. 63.2% in Ocean County) were registered to vote, including 89.4% of those ages 18 and over (vs. 82.6% countywide).

In the 2012 presidential election, Republican Mitt Romney received 62.4% of the vote (2,881 cast), ahead of Democrat Barack Obama with 36.7% (1,693 votes), and other candidates with 0.9% (42 votes), among the 4,647 ballots cast by the township's 6,583 registered voters (31 ballots were spoiled), for a turnout of 70.6%. In the 2008 presidential election, Republican John McCain received 60.0% of the vote (2,654 cast), ahead of Democrat Barack Obama with 37.6% (1,665 votes) and other candidates with 1.4% (64 votes), among the 4,423 ballots cast by the township's 5,996 registered voters, for a turnout of 73.8%. In the 2004 presidential election, Republican George W. Bush received 53.4% of the vote (506 ballots cast), outpolling Democrat John Kerry with 44.9% (425 votes) and other candidates with 0.7% (9 votes), among the 947 ballots cast by the township's 1,308 registered voters, for a turnout percentage of 72.4.

In the 2013 gubernatorial election, Republican Chris Christie received 79.2% of the vote (2,577 cast), ahead of Democrat Barbara Buono with 19.4% (631 votes), and other candidates with 1.4% (45 votes), among the 3,307 ballots cast by the township's 6,555 registered voters (54 ballots were spoiled), for a turnout of 50.5%. In the 2009 gubernatorial election, Republican Chris Christie received 67.5% of the vote (2,274 ballots cast), ahead of  Democrat Jon Corzine with 25.0% (841 votes), Independent Chris Daggett with 5.3% (178 votes) and other candidates with 1.1% (38 votes), among the 3,370 ballots cast by the township's 6,082 registered voters, yielding a 55.4% turnout.

Education 
For pre-kindergarten through sixth grade, public school students attend the Ocean Township School District. As of the 2018–19 school year, the district, comprised of two schools, had an enrollment of 510 students and 53.6 classroom teachers (on an FTE basis), for a student–teacher ratio of 9.5:1. Schools in the district (with 2018–19 enrollment data from the National Center for Education Statistics) are 
Waretown Elementary School with an enrollment of 309 students in Pre-K to 3rd grade and 
Frederic A. Priff Elementary School with 198 students in grades 4–6.

For seventh through twelfth grades, public school students attend the schools of the Southern Regional School District, which serves the five municipalities in the Long Beach Island Consolidated School District—Barnegat Light, Harvey Cedars, Long Beach Township, Ship Bottom and Surf City—along with students from Beach Haven and Stafford Township, together with the students from Ocean Township who attend as part of a sending/receiving relationship.  Schools in the district (with 2018–19 enrollment data from the National Center for Education Statistics) are 
Southern Regional Middle School with 934 students in grades 7–8 and 
Southern Regional High School with 1,952 students in grades 9–12. Both schools are in the Manahawkin section of Stafford Township.

Transportation

Roads and highways

The Garden State Parkway (accessible via Exit 69) and U.S. Route 9 both pass through the township, as does County Route 532. The Parkway connects Barnegat Township in the south to Lacey Township in the north and includes interchange 69 for CR 532, which is signed for Waretown / Forked River.

Public transportation
NJ Transit provides bus service to and from Atlantic City on the 559 bus route.

Ocean Ride local service is provided on the Waretown Shoppers Loop route.

Points of Interest 
 Albert Music Hall, 131 Wells Mill Road (CR 532). Sometimes called the "Grand Ol' Opry of the Pinelands", Albert Music Hall offers Saturday night concerts of country, bluegrass and folk music by bands from the tri-state area. The venue had its origins in the 1950s when Joseph and George Albert began hosting musical gatherings at the "Home Place," their deer lodge cabin in the Brookville section of Waretown. In 1975, the Pinelands Cultural Society was incorporated to construct a building for the preservation and promotion of the cultural history and activities of the Pinelands, including the music. Since its dedication in 1997, Albert Music Hall has hosted over 330,000 visitors. In 2000, Albert Music Hall was inducted into the American Folklore Center, Local Legacies Collection Archive in the Library of Congress, Washington, D.C.
 Lighthouse Center for Natural Resource Education, 7th Street and Navaho Drive. Facilities include the "Experience Barnegat Bay" trail with eight learning stations, a  pier into Barnegat Bay, a marine station, boat house, cabins, dormitories, a lodge, dining hall, computer lab and other recreational facilities. The site is largely handicapped accessible. A foundation operates the 501(c)(3) facility under a license agreement with the New Jersey Division of Fish and Wildlife.
 The Little Red School House and Museum, 182 Wells Mill Road (CR 532). In use between 1875 and 1958, the Little Red School House was replicated on Wells Mill Road near Waretown Lake and established as a museum. The site serves as the meeting place for the Waretown Historical Society and is open to the public 1–3 p.m. on Fridays in July and August.

Notable people

People who were born in, residents of, or otherwise closely associated with Ocean Township include:
 Kenneth G. Miller (born 1956), geologist at Rutgers University
 George E. Smith (born 1930), winner of the 2009 Nobel Prize winner in Physics for his work on the charge-coupled device
 Daniel Van Pelt (born 1964), politician who served as Ocean Township's mayor and in the New Jersey General Assembly from 2008 to 2009, when he resigned after being arrested in connection with Operation Bid Rig on federal corruption charges for allegedly accepting a $10,000 bribe
 Sung J. Woo (born 1971), author

References

External links

Ocean Township website

 
1876 establishments in New Jersey
Populated places in the Pine Barrens (New Jersey)
Populated places established in 1876
Township form of New Jersey government
Townships in Ocean County, New Jersey

kk:Оушэн Тауншип (Нью-Джерси)